Stress is a card game that uses a standard 52-card deck. It is usually only played with two people, although it is possible to play with more. The game requires each player to have a deck of numbered cards from 0 to 9. A player wins when they have lost all of their cards.

It is similar to the game of Spit.

Game rules

Setup
The deck is split into two equal piles, each player receiving one pile. Each player deals out a row of four cards in front of them, drawn from their pile. If any cards in this row share a rank, another card is dealt on top of them until no cards share ranks.

Each player then deals one card from their pile into the middle of the table, face up, to start two stacks. One stack belongs to each player.

Play
Playing simultaneously and without taking turns, players may take any card from their row and place it on one of the two central stacks. The placed card must be exactly one rank higher or lower than the top card of the stack, with aces both high and low i.e. can be placed on a king or on a two.

If the two centre stacks ever show the same rank on top, the first player to place each of their hands on each of the piles and shout "stress!" wins the call: their opponent must take both stacks and shuffle them into their card pile. Each player then deals one card to the middle as at the start of the game, and play continues.

If neither player can make a valid move, either player may deal a card from their pile into their stack in the centre. If neither player has a pile at that point, they must both take their stacks and use them as their piles.

The first player to get rid of all of their cards wins the game.

Variants
A version of Stress can be played with Uno cards, where all power cards are removed and only number cards remain.

See also
 California Speed  
 Nertz

References

Shedding-type card games
Year of introduction missing
Competitive patience card games